The Luther Luckett Correctional Complex is a Medium/MINIMUM-security state prison located in Oldham County, near La Grange, Kentucky, about 30 miles northeast of Louisville. It opened in 1981 and had a prison population 1,204 as of 2018. The Kentucky Correctional Psychiatric Center, which is operated by the Kentucky Health and Family Services Cabinet and is officially a separate facility, is located within the Luther Luckett Correctional Complex and shares several facilities with its host prison.

Due to extreme staffing shortages over the 2015–16 fiscal year, the facility now operates on two 12-hour shifts, five days a week. This has been embraced by some as substantial extra income, and heavily criticized by others due to being away from their families so often, as well as being a major source of mental and physical stress.

The current administration consists of Warden Scott Jordan, and Deputy Warden of Programs Laura Plappart. Patricia Gunter is Major of Security.  

The documentary Shakespeare Behind Bars, depicting a production of William Shakespeare's The Tempest by prison inmates, was filmed at Luther Luckett.

References

External links
 History and Overview

Buildings and structures in Oldham County, Kentucky
Prisons in Kentucky
1981 establishments in Kentucky
Government buildings completed in 1981